Abbotswood or Abbot's Wood may refer to any of several locations in the United Kingdom:

 Abbotswood, Hampshire, a village
 Abbotswood, Gloucestershire, a country house and estate 
 Abbotswood, Surrey, a village
 Abbotswood, Yate, a suburb
 Abbot's Wood, Cumbria, a former country estate near Barrow-in-Furness